N.U. (short for Nettezza urbana, Italian municipal cleansing service) is a short 1948 documentary film directed by Michelangelo Antonioni. The film examines a weekday morning of Italian janitors, captured at work on the streets of post-World War II Rome.

Although undoubtedly neorealistic in its style, this documentary does foreshadow some of Antonioni's own future trademarks, such as slow-moving camera that is enamoured with alienated and deserted urban landscapes and inanimate objects of architecture, nature, etc. and seemingly less than concerned with sweepers, washers and cleaners (almost indistinguishable from bums, and sometimes behaving much in the same way). The film's narration consists of barely several phrases; musically soundtrack alternates classical-like piano improvisations with jazzy pieces.

In 1948 N.U. won Antonioni Nastro d'Argento Best Documentary award. So did his L'amorosa menzogna next year.

References

External links 
 

1948 films
Italian black-and-white films
1940s Italian-language films
Films directed by Michelangelo Antonioni
Italian short documentary films
1940s short documentary films
1948 documentary films
Black-and-white documentary films
Films shot in Rome
Documentary films about cities
Films scored by Giovanni Fusco
1940s Italian films